Temoridae is a family of copepods, containing the following genera:
Epischura S. A. Forbes, 1882
Epischurella Smirnov, 1936
Eurytemora Giesbrecht, 1881
Ganchosia Oliveira, 1946
Heterocope G. O. Sars, 1863
Lahmeyeria Oliveira, 1946
Temora Baird, 1850

References

 
Crustacean families